Aujac is a commune in the department of Charente-Maritime in the Nouvelle-Aquitaine region in southwestern France.

History
The records the parishes in 1686 says that Aujac produces grain, wine and has grasslands

Administration
List of successive mayors:

Population

Sights

Fontaine de l'Oriou
An abundant source of water with many underground sources.

Église Saint-Martin
A Romanesque church dating from the twelfth century which was altered greatly during the invasion of the Moors. Evidence of the 3 changes (From Christianity, to Islam and back to Christianity) can be seen in the church.

See also
 Communes of the Charente-Maritime department

References

External links
 

Communes of Charente-Maritime